Roongta are the Marwari Agrawal community originally belonging to the Town of Bagar (District Jhunjhunu) in Rajasthan, India. Community of Bagar, Pilani and Jhunjhunu.

History

Origin
Rungtas and Roongtas hail from the villages/towns of Baggar-Mandrella-Pilani, all situated in District of Jhunjhunu(Rajasthan) in Shekhawati Region.

The name Roongta/ Rungta comes from "raghunathji" who was brother-in-law to "chao sati dadi". Rungtas respect "dadi" as their goddess.

Communication
Before widespread use of the internet, regular newsletters used to be circulated to those who belonged to the Roongta community. This monthly newsletter used to give a wide array of updates to all the Roongtas; including information about education, professional successes and weddings. The idea was to help all the Roongtas stay in touch with each other.

External links 
 Rungta's Connected  - http://rungtas.com a site focussed on connecting Rungtas worldwide. It also provides free emails to all Rungta & Roongta 
  Rungta News
 Rungtas on Orkut 

Social groups of Rajasthan